Founded in 1906, the Guild of Book Workers (GBW) is an organization registered in New York City which promotes the craft of bookbinding, conservation, and  the Book Arts.  Membership in the Guild is common, though not universal, among American bookbinders.

The Guild of Book Workers was created "... to establish and maintain a feeling of kinship and mutual interest among workers in the several hand book crafts." Among its early members are well-known artist-craft workers such as bookbinder Edith Diehl and printers and typographers William Addison Dwiggins and Frederic Goudy.

The Guild still believes, as did its founders, that there is a responsibility among civilized people to sustain the crafts involved with the production of fine books. Its members hope to broaden public awareness of the hand book arts, to stimulate commissions of fine bindings, and to stress the need for sound book conservation and restoration.

The Guild of Book Workers is governed by an elected group of volunteers who serve as officers, committee chairs and chairs of the regional chapters. In 1978 the Guild became incorporated as a not-for-profit corporation in New York State and is exempt from Federal income tax under section 501 (c) (3) of the Internal Revenue Code.

The GBW holds an annual conference called Standards of Excellence (usually shortened in conversation to "Standards"), during which prominent bookbinders or conservators give lectures and demonstrations intended to disseminate knowledge through the field.

The organization includes 10 regional chapters that carry out the Guildʼs mission by offering similar activities in their local areas. The Chapters produce newsletters, sponsor exhibitions and hold local meetings that feature tours, talks, lectures, demonstrations and workshops.

See also
 Books in the United States

References 

1906 establishments in the United States
Organizations based in New York City
Bookbinding
Guilds in the United States